James R. Eddy (born February 23, 1931) is a politician in the American state of Florida. He served in the Florida House of Representatives from 1963 to 1968, representing the 82nd district.

After leaving the House of Representatives James Eddy became a Municipal Judge.  He practiced law for over 50 years and retired in 2013.

Judge Eddy is a son of George William Eddy, M.D. who served in the Connecticut House of Representatives.

References

1931 births
Living people
Members of the Florida House of Representatives